Shafiq al-Fayadh  (1937 – 8 October 2015) was the commander of the Syrian 3rd Division and a close adviser to President Hafez al-Assad. He was also one of the members of his close circle.

Early life
Fayadh was born in the village of Ayb al-Arus, near Jableh, to an Alawite family of the prominent Kalbiyya clan. Other members of the clan include Fayadh's cousin, Hafez al-Assad.

His son ‘Ala is married to Lamia, the daughter of Rifaat al-Assad. Another of his sons married into a Christian family, whilst another married into a Shiite family.

Career
The 3rd Division under Fayadh played an extremely important role for the government of Hafez al-Assad. The unit, under Fayadh, was one of the first to go into Lebanon in 1976. Fayadh played an important role during the Islamic uprising in Syria, occupying Aleppo with the 3rd Division in 1980, and taking part in the Hama massacre. The Division was deployed near Damascus, in order to protect the government against potential coups.

Fayadh was retired in June 2005 as part of a restructuring program of the Syrian Army designed to pave the way for the succession of the Presidency to Bashar al-Assad from Hafez al-Assad.

Death
Fayadh died on 8 October 2015, suffering from illness.

References

1937 births
2015 deaths
Assad family
People of the Islamic uprising in Syria
Syrian military personnel
Syrian Alawites
People from Latakia Governorate